Allan Ala'alatoa (born 28 January 1994) is an Australian rugby union professional player who plays as a prop for the  in Super Rugby and the Australian rugby union team, the Wallabies.

Ala'alatoa's father Vili is a fan of cricket and named him after the Australia cricket captain Allan Border. Alaalatoa's nickname with the Brumbies squad is also rumoured to be Captain Grumpy.

Career

He attended Newington College where he played for three years in the 1st XV and completed the HSC in 2011. His big break came ahead of the 2014 Super Rugby season when he was named in the Brumbies extended playing squad. He didn't get any game time during the regular season, but surprisingly was given a debut off the replacements bench in the Brumbies 32-30 victory over the  during the Super Rugby playoffs.

International

Alaalatoa is in the rare position of having represented his country in 3 consecutive IRB Junior World Championships in 2012, 2013 and 2014.

In 2016, Alaalatoa was named in the Wallabies preliminary 39-man squad for the 2016 series against England.
He has been selected for his first test against New Zealand, starting on the bench in the Bledisloe Cup on 20 August 2016.

Ala'alatoa became the Wallabies 85th captain in the third round of the Autumn Nations Cup when the Wallabies played against Italy in a 28 to 27 loss, the Australian's first ever loss against Italy.

Super Rugby statistics

References

1994 births
Australian rugby union players
Australian rugby union captains
Rugby union props
Living people
ACT Brumbies players
Canberra Vikings players
Sportsmen from New South Wales
Australian sportspeople of Samoan descent
People educated at Newington College
Rugby union players from Sydney
Australia international rugby union players